Société nationale d'électricité et de thermique (SNET) is a French electricity generation and distribution company.

As the inheritor of Charbonnages de France's thermal power stations, SNET have an installed capacity of 2.4 gigawatts, or around 2% of the capacity of Électricité de France.

SNET has been a competitor of EDF since the opening of the French electricity market in 1999. In September 2004, the company was acquired by the Spanish company Endesa. According to L'Humanité, this was followed by the downsizing of 30% of the staff.

In June 2008 SNET was sold to the German group E.ON. As of 2012 SNET was building several combined cycle gas turbines, the two first French ones at the thermal plant Emile Huchet in Saint-Avold in northeastern France.

See also

 List of French companies
 Energy in France

External links
 Official site

References

Electric power companies of France
E.ON
Energetický a průmyslový holding